HD 97048 or CU Chamaeleontis is a Herbig Ae/Be star  away in the constellation Chamaeleon.  It is a variable star embedded in a dust cloud containing a stellar nursery, and is itself surrounded by a dust disk.

HD 97048 is a young star still contracting towards the main sequence.  Its brightness varies between magnitudes 8.38 and 8.48 and it is classified as an Orion variable.  It was given the variable star designation CU Chamaeleontis in 1981.  Its spectrum is also variable.  The spectral class is usually given as A0 or B9, sometimes with a giant luminosity class, sometimes main sequence. The spectrum shows strong variable emission lines indicative of a shell surrounding the star.

HD 97048 is a member of the Chamaeleon T1 stellar association and is still embedded within the dark molecular cloud that it is forming from. It illuminates a small reflection nebula against the dark cloud.

Planetary system
This star has a substantial dust disk having a central cavity with a 40−46 AU radius The disk has a carbon monoxide gas velocity kink and intensity gap at 130 AUs, which is suspected to be caused by a superjovian planet. In 2019, HCO+ ion and Hydrogen cyanide emission was detected from the disk, suggesting a large amount of gas is orbiting beyond 200 AU radius.

In the system a kink in the velocity of carbon monoxide gas (CO 3-2) as well as a gap in the dust emission of the disk are seen as evidence for a jovian protoplanet. The protoplanet is located at 130 au from the star and has a mass of about 2.5 Jupiter masses. It is one of the lowest mass protoplanets discovered as of 2023.

References

Chamaeleon (constellation)
Circumstellar disks
097048
Chamaeleonis, CU
054413
CD-76 488
Herbig Ae/Be stars
Hypothetical planetary systems